Felicity Ann Kendal  (born 25 September 1946) is an English actress, working principally in television and theatre. She has appeared in numerous stage and screen roles over a more than 70-year career, but the role that brought attention to her career was that of Barbara Good in the 1975 television series The Good Life.

Early life
Felicity Kendal was born in Olton, Warwickshire, England, in 1946. She is the younger daughter of Laura Liddell and Geoffrey Kendal, an actor and manager. Her older sister, Jennifer Kendal, was also an actress.

After early years in Birmingham, Kendal lived in India with her family at the age of seven: her father was an English actor-manager who led his own repertory company on tours of India. The ensemble would perform Shakespeare before royalty one day and in rough rural villages the next, where audiences included many schoolchildren. As the family travelled, Kendal attended six different Loreto College convent schools in India, and contracted typhoid fever in Calcutta at the age of 17.

The Good Life

In 1975, Kendal had her big break on television with the BBC sitcom The Good Life. She and Richard Briers starred as Barbara and Tom Good – a middle-class suburban couple who decide to quit the rat race and become self-sufficient, much to the consternation of their snooty but well-meaning neighbour Margo (Penelope Keith) and her down-to-earth husband Jerry Leadbetter (Paul Eddington). Kendal appeared in all 30 episodes, which extended over four series and two specials from 1975 to 1978.

Stage work
Kendal made her stage debut aged nine months, when she was carried on stage as a changeling boy in A Midsummer Night's Dream.

She made her London stage debut in Minor Murder (1967). Her stage career blossomed during the 1980s and 1990s when she formed a close professional association with Tom Stoppard, starring in the first productions of many of his plays, including The Real Thing (1982), Hapgood (1988), Arcadia (1993), and Indian Ink (1995). This last was originally a radio play and the role was written for her.

She won the Evening Standard Theatre Award in 1989 for her performances in Much Ado About Nothing and Ivanov.

In 2002, Kendal starred in Charlotte Jones's play Humble Boy when it transferred from the National Theatre to the West End. In 2006 she starred in the West End revival of Amy's View by David Hare.

In 2008 she appeared in the West End in a revival of Noël Coward's play The Vortex. In 2009, she appeared in the play The Last Cigarette (by Simon Gray) and in 2010 in Mrs. Warren's Profession (by George Bernard Shaw). Both played at the Chichester Festival Theatre and subsequently in the West End.

In October 2013, she toured the UK with Simon Callow in Chin-Chin, an English translation by Willis Hall of Francois Billetdoux's Tchin-Tchin. That same year, she starred in the first London revival of Relatively Speaking by Alan Ayckbourn at Wyndham's Theatre. In 2014, she toured the UK and Australia as Judith Bliss in Noël Coward's Hay Fever, which then played in the West End.

In 2017, she starred with Maureen Lipman in a revival of Lettice and Lovage at the Menier Chocolate Factory.

In 2021, Kendal starred as Evangeline Harcourt in the London revival of Anything Goes at the Barbican Theatre.

In 2023, Kendal starred as Dotty Otley in the London revival of Noises Off at the Phoenix Theatre.

Other work
In 1995, Kendal was one of the readers of Edward Lear poems on a specially made spoken word audio CD bringing together a collection of Lear's nonsense songs.

Personal life
Kendal's first marriage to Drewe Henley (1968–1979) and her second to Michael Rudman (1983–94) ended in divorce. Kendal has two sons: Charley from her marriage to Henley and Jacob from her marriage to Rudman. In 1991, she left Rudman but they reunited in 1998.

Kendal was brought up in the Catholic faith. She converted to Judaism at the time of her second marriage, but has stated about the conversion, "I felt I was returning to my roots." Her conversion took more than three years; she has stated that her decision to convert had "nothing to do" with her husband. Kendal's memoirs, titled White Cargo, were published in 1998.

When asked by The Guardian in 2010 whom she would invite to her "dream dinner party", Kendal replied "Emmeline Pankhurst, Gandhi, Byron, Eddie Izzard, George Bernard Shaw, Golda Meir, and Marlene Dietrich."

Kendal was appointed Commander of the Order of the British Empire in the 1995 New Year Honours for services to drama. Kendal is an ambassador for the charity Royal Voluntary Service, previously known as WRVS.

Selected filmography

Television work

Love Story (1966) – two episodes
The Wednesday Play (1966)
ITV Play of the Week (1967)
Half Hour Story (1967)
Boy Meets Girl (1967)
Thirty-Minute Theatre (1967)
Man in a Suitcase (1968)
The Tenant of Wildfell Hall (1968 and 1969) – two episodes as Rose
The Woodlanders (1970) – four episodes as Grace Melbury
Jason King (1972)
The Dolly Dialogues (1973)
Dolly (1973) – three episodes as Dolly
Edward the Seventh (1975) – seven episodes as Princess Vicky
Murder (1976)
Do You Remember? (1978)
The Good Life (1975–1978) – 30 episodes over four series as Barbara Good
ITV Sunday Night Drama (1967–1978) – three episodes as Dorothy Wordsworth and Nicola
Wings of Song (1978) television film
Twelfth Night (1980, BBC Television Shakespeare), as Viola
Solo (1981–1982) – thirteen episodes (over two series) as Gemma Palmer
On the Razzle (1983), television version of stage play
The Mistress (1985–1987) – twelve episodes as Maxine
The Camomile Lawn (1992) – five episodes as Helena
Shakespeare: The Animated Tales (1992) – one episode (Romeo and Juliet) as narrator
Honey for Tea (1994) – seven episodes as Nancy Belasco
The World of Peter Rabbit and Friends (1995)
Rosemary & Thyme (2003–2006) – 22 episodes (over three series) as Rosemary Boxer
The Secret Show (2007) – voice role as Lucy Woo
Doctor Who (2008) – guest appearance in the episode "The Unicorn and the Wasp"
Inside No.9 (2017) – guest appearance in the episode "Private View"
Pennyworth (2019) – guest appearance in the episode "Cilla Black"

As herself:
Strictly Come Dancing (series 8) (2010)  – partnered with Vincent Simone. The couple were eliminated in the eighth week (staged in Blackpool)
Felicity Kendal's Indian Shakespeare Quest (2012)
Piers Morgan's Life Stories (2012)

Film work
Kendal's film roles are:
Shakespeare Wallah (1965) – as Lizzie Buckingham. The film (by Merchant Ivory) was loosely based on the Kendal family's real-life experiences in post-colonial India.
Valentino (1977) – as June Mathis
We're Back! A Dinosaur's Story (1993) – voiced Elsa
Parting Shots (1999) – as Jill Saunders
How Proust Can Change Your Life (2000) – as narrator

Awards

1976 – Most Promising Newcomer – Variety Club
1979 – Best Actress – Variety Club
1980 – Clarence Derwent Award
1984 – Woman of the Year – Best Actress – Variety Club
1989 – Best Actress – Evening Standard Theatre Awards

References

Sources

External links
Felicity Kendal at the British Film Institute

1946 births
Living people
Commanders of the Order of the British Empire
People from Olton
English stage actresses
English television actresses
English film actresses
English voice actresses
Converts to Judaism
Jewish English actresses
English musical theatre actresses
English Shakespearean actresses
20th-century English actresses
21st-century English actresses